Stuckless Glacier is a broad glacier in the southwest part of Black Island, Ross Archipelago. If flows southwest between Rowe Nunataks and Cape Beck to Moraine Strait, McMurdo Ice Shelf. Named by Advisory Committee on Antarctic Names (US-ACAN) (1999) after John S. Stuckless, Department of Geology, Northern Illinois University, DeKalb (later U.S. Geological Survey), who, in several seasons from 1972–73, investigated the geochemistry of McMurdo volcanic rocks, correlating samples from several Ross Island sites with DVDP core samples obtained in McMurdo Dry Valleys.

Glaciers of the Ross Dependency
Black Island (Ross Archipelago)